Jack Strachey (25 September 1894 – 27 May 1972) was an English composer and songwriter

Born John Francis Strachey in London on 25 September 1894, he began writing songs in the 1920s for the theatre and the music hall, scoring his first success with songs he had written for Frith Shephard's long running musical revue Lady Luck which opened at The Carlton Theatre in April 1927 where it ran for 324 performances.

In the 1930s, he began to collaborate with Eric Maschwitz  and in 1936 Strachey, Maschwitz (using the pen name Holt Marvell), and Harry Link co-wrote "These Foolish Things (Remind Me of You)", which was to provide a top ten hit for five separate artists in 1936. Benny Goodman was among the five artists to record the song in 1936, and it has been widely covered since - by Billie Holiday, Thelonious Monk and Bryan Ferry among others.  Under the title "Ces Petites Choses", it was also a hit in France for Dorothy Dickson. Strachey scored another success in 1940 (this time with Eric Maschwitz and Manning Sherwin) with the song "A Nightingale Sang in Berkeley Square".

In the 1940s Strachey began to compose popular light music pieces for orchestra, and is best remembered in Britain as the composer of "Theatreland", "Pink Champagne", and especially "In Party Mood" (1944), which was the signature tune of Housewives' Choice, a popular radio show on the BBC Light Programme which ran until 1967.

Jack Strachey moved to Brighton in 1958 and died there on 27 May 1972.

References

1894 births
1972 deaths
Musicians from London
English composers
English songwriters
Light music composers
Jack